Travis Baird (born 25 July 1986) is an Australian rules football player who was drafted by the Western Bulldogs from the Brisbane Lions in the 2005 AFL Draft (3rd round, number 46 overall).  He played 3 games with the Bulldogs, and played 2 games with Brisbane in 2005.

Overview
Baird was destined to spend the rest of 2006 on Brisbane's rookie list, and thus took the decision to enter the draft at the end of 2005.  He played most of 2005 with the Suncoast Lions in the AFLQ as a midfielder, showing enough ability to be promoted to Brisbane's senior list in the second half of the season, where he played two senior games.

Following the 2007 AFL season Baird was delisted by the Western Bulldogs, after he was unable to secure a single senior game for the year.

External links

References

Western Bulldogs players
1986 births
Living people
Brisbane Lions players
Australian rules footballers from Victoria (Australia)
Werribee Football Club players
Queensland Australian Football League players
Bendigo Pioneers players
People from Donald, Victoria